Île Takamaka may refer to one of two islands in separate groups in the Chagos Archipelago in the Indian Ocean:

 the Egmont Islands
 the Salomon Islands

Chagos Archipelago